Borj El Amri Airport  is a small airport near Borj El Amri, a city in the Manouba Governorate of Tunisia. The airport is used as a training site of the Aviation School of Borj El Amri  belonging to the Tunesian Ministry of Defense.

World War II
During World War II, the airport was known as Massicault Airfield and was used by the United States Army Air Forces Twelfth Air Force during the North African Campaign. Known units assigned were:

 2d Bombardment Group, 31 Jul-2 Dec 1943, B-17 Flying Fortress
 320th Bombardment Group, 29 Jun-28 Jul 1943, B-26 Marauder
 68th Reconnaissance Group, Oct-Nov 1943, F-4/F-5 Lightning

See also
 Boeing B-17 Flying Fortress airfields in the Mediterranean Theater of Operations

References

External links
 Tunisian Civil Aviation and Airports Authority (OACA)

Airports in Tunisia
Airfields of the United States Army Air Forces in Tunisia
Airfields of the Fifteenth Air Force during World War II